"In My Dreams" is a song by American rock band REO Speedwagon, from their twelfth studio album Life as We Know It. Released as the third single from the album, the song was a top 20 hit in the U.S., where it peaked at No. 19 on the Billboard Hot 100 in October 1987. It also peaked at No. 6 on the Adult Contemporary chart. In Canada, it reached a peak of No. 61.

Cash Box called it a "sentimental and romantic spin [that] should connect with AC and CHR."

Track listing 
US/Canada/Europe 7" single
A. "In My Dreams" - 4:20
B. "Over the Edge" - 3:56

References

1987 songs
1987 singles
REO Speedwagon songs
Songs written by Kevin Cronin
Songs written by Tom Kelly (musician)
Song recordings produced by Kevin Cronin
Song recordings produced by Gary Richrath
Rock ballads
Epic Records singles